Péter Scherer (born 16 November 1961 in Ajka) is a Hungarian stage and film actor.

Biography
Scherer was born in Ajka, Hungary. After finishing his secondary school in Szombathely, he graduated from Budapest University of Technology and Economics in 1987. First he became a member of the Arvisura Theatre Company (between 1984 and 1994). From 1995 he was freelance actor. Later he joined the Bárka Theatre in 1997.

Since 2002 he has been a member of the Krétakör Theater. His famous movie role was in Miklós Jancsó’s The Lord's Lantern in Budapest (1999) as Pepe. He also appeared in movies like Kontroll (2003), One day in Europe (2005), Doll No. 639 (2005), Carlos (2010).

He received the Jászai Mari Award in 2009.

Theater roles

 William Shakespeare: A Midsummer Night's Dream....Demetrius; Orrondi; Ormándi Béla – Mustármag
 Merle: Madrapur....
 Szophoklész: Oidipusz....
 William Shakespeare: Hamlet....Claudius
 István Tasnádi: Bábelna....Hornyák Dávid
 William Shakespeare: Macbeth....McDuff; Banquo
 García Lorca: Don Cristobal....Figaro
 Büchner: Woyzeck....Captain
 John Webster: The Duchess of Malfi
 Glowaczki: Antigone in New York....Policeman
 Csehov: The Seagull....Samrajev
 Molière: Mizantrope....Oronte
 Ödön von Horváth: Kasimir és Karoline....Lilliputi; Doctor
 Vladimir Szorokin: The Ice....Autodriver
 Kai Hensel: Klamm's war....Klamm
 Crimp: a.N.N.a (Attempts On Her Life)

Filmography

External links
 
 Hungarian Theater Database
 Krétakör Theatre

1961 births
Living people
People from Ajka
Hungarian male stage actors
Hungarian male film actors